Margaret Colin (born May 26, 1958) is an American actress. She is known for her roles as Margo Hughes on As the World Turns and as Eleanor Waldorf-Rose on Gossip Girl.

Early life
Margaret Colin was born in Brooklyn, New York City, and was raised in Baldwin, New York, on Long Island. She is of Irish descent and was raised in a Catholic family; She graduated from Baldwin Senior High School in 1976, and after attended Hofstra University.

Career
Colin began her acting career in the soap opera The Edge of Night, playing an heiress and former terrorist. In seven months on that show, her character survived seven murder attempts and ended up marrying her stepbrother. She followed that role with a longer stint on As the World Turns, originating the role of Margo Montgomery, a character that endured nearly 30 years.

She has appeared on a number of primetime television shows, starting with Foley Square, Leg Work, and several early episodes of Chicago Hope. She played Lisa Wiseman on the 1999 series Now and Again, with Eric Close and Dennis Haysbert. In 2003, she appeared in an episode of Law & Order: Special Victims Unit titled "Tortured", playing a mother/bakery owner who was later arrested for abetting a murder.

From 2007 to 2012, Colin played the recurring role of Eleanor Waldorf, mother of Blair Waldorf, on the teen drama television series Gossip Girl. In the pilot episode, Eleanor was played by One Life to Live actress Florencia Lozano.

Colin has also been in a number of films, some of the most well-known including Something Wild (1986), Three Men and a Baby (1987), The Butcher's Wife (1991), Independence Day (1996), The Devil's Own (1997), Unfaithful (2002), and First Daughter (2004). She also appeared in the play Jackie: An American Life, in which she played Jacqueline Kennedy.

During her 2003 performance of the English play A Day in the Death of Joe Egg on Broadway, Colin smoked her way through the second half of the show and dedicated the performance to Mayor Michael Bloomberg in defiance of the state's smoking ban. After the play finished its run, she gave up smoking.

In 2017, Colin appeared as a recurring character throughout the sixth season of the HBO comedy series Veep, playing fictional CBS News anchor Jane McCabe. Along with her fellow cast members, Colin won the Screen Actors Guild Award for Outstanding Performance by an Ensemble in a Comedy Series. In 2019, she reprised her role as McCabe in the seventh season premiere of Veep and again in the series finale.

Colin performed on Broadway as Mrs. Mullin in the 2018 revival of Carousel.

Personal life
Colin met actor Justin Deas when he played her love interest, Tom Hughes, on As the World Turns. They were married in January 1988. The couple have two sons, Sam and Joe, and Colin is stepmother of her husband's daughter from his first marriage. The family moved to Upper Montclair, New Jersey in the late 1990s.

She is an anti-abortion activist and was formerly the honorary co-chair of Feminists for Life, an organization opposed to abortion. Colin is an honorary board member of the group Feminists for Nonviolent Choices.

Filmography

Film

Television

References

External links

 

1958 births
Living people
20th-century American actresses
21st-century American actresses
Actresses from New York City
American film actresses
American people of Irish descent
American soap opera actresses
American stage actresses
American television actresses
Hofstra University alumni
People from Brooklyn
People from Baldwin, Nassau County, New York
People from Montclair, New Jersey
Theatre World Award winners